Illustrated may refer to:

Classics Illustrated
Cook's Illustrated
Fiction Illustrated
Frost Illustrated
Hero Illustrated
Horns Illustrated
Illustrated Life Rhodesia
Lloyd's Illustrated London Newspaper
Marvel Illustrated
Mechanix Illustrated
Military Illustrated
Pro Wrestling Illustrated
Railroads Illustrated
Science Illustrated
Sports Illustrated
Sports Illustrated Kids
The Illustrated American
The War Illustrated

Illustrated Magazine or The Illustrated Magazine may refer to:

Hutchings' Illustrated California Magazine, San Francisco
The English Illustrated Magazine, London

Illustrated News or The Illustrated News may refer to:

Canadian Illustrated News, Montreal
The Illustrated Australian News
The Illustrated London News
The Illustrated Police News, London
Illustrated Police News (Boston)
Illustrated Sporting and Dramatic News, London
Illustrated Sydney News
The Illustrated War News, London

Illustrated Daily News may refer to:
Illustrated Daily News (Los Angeles),  or Los Angeles Daily News (1923-1954) in Los Angeles, later merged to Los Angeles Mirror 
Illustrated Daily News (New York), in New York, earlier title of the New York Daily News 

Illustrated Weekly or The Illustrated Weekly may refer to:

Redpath's Illustrated Weekly
The Illustrated Times Weekly Newspaper
The Illustrated Weekly Hudd
The Illustrated Weekly of India
Weekly Illustrated

Illustrated Monthly or The Illustrated Monthly may refer to:
Hutchings' Illustrated California Magazine, San Francisco
The English Illustrated Magazine, London

Other languages
Berliner Illustrirte Zeitung, Germany
Illustreret Folkeblad, Norway
Illustreret Nyhedsblad, Norway
Illustreret Tidende, DenmarkL'Illustré, FranceLe Monde illustré, FranceLe Petit Français illustré, France

See also
CNN Sports Illustrated, or CNN/SI, was a 24-hour sports news network. It was created by Time Warner, bringing together its CNN and Sports Illustrated brands and related resources. It was launched on December 12, 1996
The Illustrated Man (film), a 1969 American dark science fiction drama film directed by Jack Smight
News Illustrated, a full-page information graphic that runs every Sunday in the South Florida Sun-SentinelPenny Illustrated Paper'', a cheap (1d.) illustrated weekly newspaper that ran from 1861 to 1913

Disambiguation pages
Illustrated Magazine (disambiguation)
Illustrated News (disambiguation)
Illustrated Weekly (disambiguation)